Santa Maria del Carmine is a Baroque-style, deconsecrated Roman Catholic church in Pistoia, region of Tuscany, Italy.

History
In 1291, construction of a church and adjacent convent were completed. In the 16th century, the church was remodelled and enlarged under the designs of Antonio Arrighi, and now housing Carmelite friars from Mantua. That church was consecrated in 1565. In 1741, a further refurbishment took place, granting the church its present late Baroque structure and decoration. In the early 19th century, the by-then suppressed convent and church were granted by the Napoleonic government to the local Pistoian Academy of Sciences, Letters and Arts. In the 21st century, the church underwent renewed restructuring

The society maintained the church and its decorations. A survey of the church in 1821 described the following works:
St Teresa of Avila by Ignazio Hugford for the altar of the Desideri family 
Virgin of the Carmine by Pietro Marchesini for the altar of the Chiappelli family. 
Fall of Manna in Desert by Cigoli for the main Altar
Faith and Hope (frescoes above the Cigoli altarpiece) were by Vincenzo Meucci
Choir frescoes with medallions by Tommaso Gherardini
Medallions by Gherardini and Meucci
Enthroned Madonna, Jesus, St Niccolò, and other Saints by Leonardo Malatesta for the altar of the Conversini family

References

13th-century Roman Catholic church buildings in Italy
Churches completed in 1291
18th-century Roman Catholic church buildings in Italy
Roman Catholic churches in Pistoia
Baroque architecture in Tuscany